Thierry Humeau (born 8 November 1961 in Poitiers) is a former French slalom canoeist who competed from the mid-1980s to the early 1990s. He won three medals at the ICF Canoe Slalom World Championships with two silvers (C1 team: 1987, 1989) and a bronze (C1: 1989).  Humeau also finished 8th in the C1 event at the 1992 Summer Olympics in Barcelona.

In the late 80s, he worked as a freelance photojournalist with Sigma Photo Agency in Paris. After the Olympics, Thierry moved to the US and migrated to TV & Film production. He has traveled around the globe reporting for major international television networks such as National Geographic TV, Vice, HBO, Aljazeera and the BBC.  Experienced in difficult and challenging assignments, he has covered war zones, humanitarian, environmental and development issues. Thierry has also consulted with Sony and AVID Technology on the development and testing of large sensor cameras and file based editing workflows.

World Cup individual podiums

References

Sports-reference.com profile

External links 
 Thierry HUMEAU at CanoeSlalom.net

1961 births
Canoeists at the 1992 Summer Olympics
French male canoeists
Living people
Olympic canoeists of France
Medalists at the ICF Canoe Slalom World Championships